The Democratic Peasants' Party–Stere (PȚD–Stere) was a political party in Romania.

History
The party was established by Constantin Stere after he left the National Peasants' Party (PNȚ). In the 1931 general elections, PȚD–Stere ran in an alliance with the League Against Usury (LCC). The alliance received 2.8% of the vote, winning six seats in the Chamber of Deputies. The LCC took one seat and the PȚD-Stere took five. The party ran alone in the 1932 elections, receiving 1.4% of the vote and losing all five seats. It later merged into the new Radical Peasants' Party (PȚD) established the following year.

Electoral history

Legislative elections

References

Agrarian parties in Romania
Defunct political parties in Romania
National Peasants' Party breakaway groups